Estelle Cascino and Camilla Rosatello are the defending champions, but Rosatello chose not to participate. Cascino partnered with Conny Perrin, but they lost to Inès Ibbou and Naïma Karamoko in the quarterfinals.

Ibbou and Karamoko went on to win the title, defeating Jenny Dürst and Weronika Falkowska in the final, 2–6, 6–3, [16–14].

Seeds

Draw

Draw

References

External Links
Main Draw

Elle Spirit Open - Doubles